Kamal Dasgupta (28 July 1912 – 20 July 1974), also known as Kamal Uddin Ahamed was a Bangla music director, composer and folk artist. Rāga and Thumri were the main elements of his music.

Early life and career
Dasgupta was born on 28 July 1912 in Narail, Jessore of the then British India. He matriculated in 1928 from Calcutta Academy and later completed B. Com. from Comilla Victoria Government College. He earned his doctorate in music from Banaras Hindu University in 1943 for his work on Meerabai, the composer and singer of Bhajans. His early inspiration came from his father, Tara Prasanna Dasgupta. He took his first music lessons from his brother, Bimal Das Gupta. Later he studied under Dilip Kumar Roy, K C Dey (Kana Keshto), and Jamiruddin Khan.

Dasgupta sang modern songs in Bengali, Urdu, Hindi, and Tamil. He was also a composer, composing the music for about eight thousand songs. His work was based on classical music and tended towards the Thungri style, though he also drew inspiration from other sources.

Dasgupta composed the music for about eighty Bangla films, among them Tufan Mail, Jhamelar Prem, Ei Ki Go Shes Dan. His last film as a music director was Badhu Bharan (1967). He also composed the background music for an American film, War Propaganda. His active life as a composer covered about fourteen years. His unique contribution in music is his invention of a shorthand method for swaralipi (notations).

In 1935, Dasgupta joined the Gramophone Company of India as a music director. During his term there, he developed a close association with Kazi Nazrul Islam and composed the music for almost four hundred of his songs. The gramophone records for which Dasgupta composed music were notable in the 1950s and 1960s. Among his songs still notable today are Sanjher Taraka Ami (I am the star of twilight), Prithivi Amare Chay (The world needs me), and ''Ami Bhorer Juthika' '(I am the jasmine of morning).

Dasgupta died on 18 July 1974 in Dhaka.

Discography

Hindi

Bengali

References

External links 

 

1912 births
1974 deaths
People from Jessore District
20th-century Bangladeshi musicians
Bangladeshi film score composers
Bangladeshi male musicians
20th-century Bangladeshi male singers
20th-century Bangladeshi singers
Comilla Victoria Government College alumni
Burials at Banani Graveyard
Male film score composers
Converts to Islam from Hinduism
Bangladeshi Muslims